The Road Traffic Regulation Act 1984 is an Act of Parliament in the United Kingdom, which provided powers to regulate or restrict traffic on UK roads, in the interest of safety. It superseded some earlier legislation, including the majority of the Road Traffic Regulation Act 1967. The Act is split into 10 parts covering 147 sections, it also includes 14 schedules.

Part 1: General Provisions For Traffic Regulations

Part 1 includes sections 1 to 13 of the Act. The legislation contained in these sections covers:

 Traffic Regulation Orders (TRO), known as Traffic Management Orders (TMO) in Greater London
 Regulations outside Greater London
 Regulations in Greater London
 Experimental traffic schemes - these can be introduced for up to 18 months, to allow an authority to assess the impacts of a scheme such as traffic diversions.

Part 2: Traffic Regulation In Special Cases

Part 2 includes sections 14 to 22 of the Act. The legislation contained in these sections covers:

 Various powers relating to traffic regulation in special cases including:
 Temporary prohibitions and restrictions of traffic
 Traffic regulation on certain categories of roads
 One-way traffic on trunk roads
 Permits for trailers to carry excess weight

Part 3: Crossings And Playgrounds

Part 3 includes sections 23 to 31 of the Act. The legislation contained in these sections covers:

 Pedestrian crossings
 School crossings
 Street playgrounds

Part 4: Parking Places

Part 4 includes sections 32 to 63 of the Act. The legislation contained in these sections covers:

 Provision of off-street parking and parking on roads without payment
 Control of off-street parking
 Parking on highways for payment
 Provision of parking places by parish or community councils
 Special parking provisions

Part 5: Traffic Signs

Part 5 includes sections 64 to 80 of the Act. The legislation contained in these sections covers:

 General provisions
 Provisions as to Greater London
 Supplementary provision

Part 6: Speed Limits

Part 6 includes sections 81 to 91 of the Act. The legislation contained in these sections covers:

 Various powers relating to speed limits including:
 Speed limits on restricted and non-restricted roads
 Traffic signs indicating speed restrictions
 Speeding offences
 Approval of radar speed measuring devices
 Speed limitations to certain types of vehicle (section 86)

Part 7: Bollards And Other Obstructions

Part 7 includes sections 92 to 94 of the Act. The legislation contained in these sections covers:

 Bollards and other obstructions

Part 8: Control And Enforcement

Part 8 includes sections 95 to 111 of the Act. The legislation contained in these sections covers:

 Traffic Wardens
 Penalties other than fixed penalties
 Removal or immobilisation of vehicles
 Enforcement of excess parking charges

Part 9: Further Provisions As To Enforcement

Part 9 includes sections 112 to 121 of the Act. The legislation contained in these sections covers:

 General provisions
 Special provisions relating to Scotland

Part 10: General And Supplementary Provisions

Part 10 includes sections 122 to 147 of the Act. The legislation contained in these sections covers:

 Various supplementary powers including:
 Exercise of functions by local authorities
 Boundary roads
 Footpaths, bridleways and byways open to all traffic
 Power to hold inquiries
 Application of the Act to Crown roads
 Application of the Act to the Isles of Scilly
 Vehicles used for marine salvage
 Hovercraft
 Tramcars and trolley vehicles

Schedules

The Act contains 14 schedules.

See also 
 Highways Act 1980
 Traffic Signs Regulations and General Directions

References

External links 
The full text of the Act at legislation.gov.uk

United Kingdom Acts of Parliament 1984
Road safety
Traffic law
Roads in the United Kingdom
1984 in transport
Transport policy in the United Kingdom
Road safety in the United Kingdom
History of transport in the United Kingdom
Transport legislation